Judah David Bleich (born August 24, 1936 in Tarrytown, New York) is an authority on Jewish law and ethics, including Jewish medical ethics. He is a professor of Talmud (rosh yeshiva) at the Rabbi Isaac Elchanan Theological Seminary, an affiliate of Yeshiva University, as well as head of its postgraduate institute for the study of Talmudic jurisprudence and family law. At Yeshiva University, he holds the Herbert and Florence Tenzer Chair in Jewish Law and Ethics. He also teaches at Cardozo Law School. He is married to Dr. Judith Bleich, a historian of 19th-century European Jewry.

Bleich brings an Orthodox perspective to governmental deliberations on bioethics. For example, in 1988 he served on the NIH Human Fetal Tissue Transplantation Research Panel and testified before Congress on the Pain Relief Promotion Act. In 1984, New York Governor Mario Cuomo appointed Bleich to the Governor's Commission on Life and the Law.

Early life and education
Bleich is the older of two sons of Rabbi Manning H. Bleich and his wife Beatrice. He attended public elementary school and received private tutoring on Jewish subjects. Later, he studied in Yeshiva Torah Vodaath and Beis Medrash Elyon, under Rabbi Elya Chazan. From 1958–1962 he attended the Kollel in Yeshiva Chofetz Chaim of Radun. He received a bachelor's degree from Brooklyn College in 1960, a master's degree from Columbia University in 1968, and a PhD from New York University in 1974.

Bleich is a Woodrow Wilson Fellow, a postdoctoral fellow at the Hastings Center, and fellow of the Academy of Jewish Philosophy. He received rabbinic ordination from Yeshiva Torah Vodaath, and advanced ordination ("Yadin Yadin") from Rabbis Moshe Feinstein and Mendel Zaks.

Bleich was a close student of the late Rabbi Yaakov Kamenetsky.

Publications
Bleich is the author of Contemporary Halakhic Problems (seven volumes); Bioethical Dilemmas: A Jewish Perspective (two volumes); Jewish Bioethics (a collection of essays, which he co-edited with Fred Rosner); With Perfect Faith: Foundations of Jewish Belief; Time of Death in Jewish Law; Judaism and Healing; The Philosophical Quest; and DNA in Halakhah.  He has written a book about the blessing on observing the sun return to the original position it occupied at creation (Bircas Hachamah,).  In Hebrew, he has published Be-Netivot ha-Halakhah (four volumes). His Ph.D. thesis is Providence in the late medieval Jewish philosophy (NYU, 1974). He has written extensively on the applications of Jewish law to contemporary social issues and on the interface of Jewish law and the American legal system. He serves as the long-standing contributor of the survey of halakhic literature for Tradition: A Journal of Orthodox Jewish Thought.

Yeshiva University
Bleich holds the position of rosh kollel for the Yadin Yadin Kollel (Institute for the Study of Jewish Monetary Law) in Yeshiva University. Additionally, he gives a Chullin/Yoreh Deah course (Jewish dietary laws) in RIETS, as well as a few courses in Jewish Philosophy in IBC.

Yorkville Synagogue

Bleich has been the rabbi (Jewish spiritual leader) of the Yorkville Synagogue, located in Manhattan for over 45 years. He teaches Talmud classes on Shabbat. He also teaches Jewish halakhic or philosophical issues in a program every other Sabbath.  The topic usually is related to the subject matter of the weekly Torah portion.

References

External links
Rabbi Bleich's recorded Torah lectures
Articles by J. David Bleich on the Berman Jewish Policy Archive at NYU Wagner
Rabbi Isaac Elchanan Theological Seminary
Yorkville Synagogue

American Haredi rabbis
Brooklyn College alumni
Columbia University alumni
New York University alumni
Beth Medrash Elyon alumni
Yeshiva University rosh yeshivas
Jewish ethicists
Jewish medical ethics
People from Tarrytown, New York
Living people
1936 births
Authors of books on Jewish law